The Roots of Guns N' Roses is a compilation album containing old songs of Hollywood Rose. It was released on June 22, 2004, by Deadline Music (Cleopatra Records).

Background
The album was produced by Chris Weber, the band's ex-guitarist. Cleopatra records bought the five tracks from Weber, who originally paid for the recordings in 1984. It contains three sets of five demos: the first five are original versions, the following five have been remixed by former-Guns N' Roses guitarist Gilby Clarke, and the last five have been remixed by Fred Coury, the drummer of Cinderella, who took part in a tour with Guns N' Roses when Steven Adler broke his wrist.

The "Shadow of Your Love" and "Reckless Life" remixes by Gilby Clarke were recorded with the first guitarist of Guns N' Roses, Tracii Guns.

The songs "Anything Goes" and "Reckless Life" were later recorded again by Guns N' Roses. They were released on the albums Appetite for Destruction and G N' R Lies, respectively.

Slash, Duff McKagan and Steven Adler, together with Axl Rose, Chris Weber and Izzy Stradlin, were credited as the composers of "Anything Goes", "Shadow of Your Love" and "Reckless Life". These songs were originally performed by Hollywood Rose and were only later played by Guns N' Roses. In fact, when Rose, Weber and Stradlin composed these songs, they were not yet in touch with Slash, McKagan or Adler.

On January 18, 2005, the Japanese version was released by Sony, together with a bonus DVD.

Before the album's release in June 2004, Rose sued the record label Cleopatra Records for "trademark infringement, violation of rights in his name and likeness, and for unfair competition", and filed a motion to block the release, however a judge denied the motion and the album was released.

Track listing

Personnel
Tracii Guns – guitar and backing vocals on tracks 9 and 10
Johnny Kreis – drums
W. Axl Rose – lead vocals
Izzy Stradlin – rhythm guitar, bass, backing vocals
Chris Weber – lead guitar, bass

References

2004 compilation albums
Hollywood Rose albums
Guns N' Roses